The 2014–15 Alabama A&M Bulldogs basketball team represented Alabama Agricultural and Mechanical University during the 2014–15 NCAA Division I men's basketball season. The Bulldogs, led by fourth year head coach Willie Hayes, played their home games at Elmore Gymnasium and were members of the Southwestern Athletic Conference. They finished the season 9–20, 8–10 in SWAC play to finish in seventh place. They lost in the quarterfinals of the SWAC tournament to Southern.

Roster

Schedule

|-
!colspan=9 style="background:#800000; color:#FFFFFF;"| Regular season

 

|-
!colspan=9 style="background:#800000; color:#FFFFFF;"| SWAC tournament

References

Alabama A&M Bulldogs basketball seasons
Alabama AandM